Aleksandrovac is a town and municipality located in the Rasina District of central Serbia. As of 2011, the town has a population of 6,476 inhabitants, while the municipality has 26,522 inhabitants.

History
From 1929 to 1941, Aleksandrovac was part of the Morava Banovina of the Kingdom of Yugoslavia.

Demographics

According to the 2011 census results, the municipality of Aleksandrovac has a population of 26,522 inhabitants.

Ethnic groups
The ethnic composition of the municipality:

Society and culture

The most popular event is Župska berba, which is held annually from 22 September to 25 September. Aleksandrovac is the headquarters of one of the most successful Yugoslav record labels of all time Diskos.

The town has several sports teams among which the most popular are the basketball, volleyball and handball teams that play in the top division in Serbia. Also, it is home to FK Župa Aleksandrovac football team.

Economy
The following table gives a preview of the total number of registered people employed in legal entities per their core activity (as of 2018):

Notable people
 Dimitri Davidovic, former footballer
 Danijel Gašić, footballer
 Ivan Lapcevic, handball player
 Ivan Tomić,   musician

References

External links

 Aleksandrovac Official Site

Populated places in Rasina District